Kim 500 Milyar İster? (English translation: Who wants 500 thousand million?) was a Turkish game show based on the original British format of Who Wants to Be a Millionaire?. The show was hosted by the Turkish actor Kenan Işik. The main goal of the game was to win TL 500 billion (500,000 YTL after 2005 redenomination) by answering 15 multiple-choice questions correctly. There were three lifelines - fifty fifty, phone a friend and ask the audience. It was shown on Show TV and Kanal D.

Money Tree

References

Who Wants to Be a Millionaire?
Turkish television series
2000s Turkish television series
2000 Turkish television series debuts
2004 Turkish television series endings
Turkish game shows
Show TV original programming
Kanal D original programming